Mark Piznarski is an American film director, television director and television producer.

He has directed episodes from a number of television series, including, amongst others, Veronica Mars, Gossip Girl, 90210, NYPD Blue, Friday Night Lights, Everwood, My So-Called Life, Relativity and Once and Again.

He has also directed a number of television films including Death Benefit (1996), The '60s (1999), and Soccer Moms (2005). In 2000, he directed the theatrical film Here on Earth. In 2006, he wrote and directed the film Looking for Sunday (2006), the only writing credit to his name.

The Veronica Mars character Stosh "Piz" Piznarski is named as a tribute to Mark, as he directed the first two episodes of season one, titled "Pilot" and "Credit Where Credit's Due", respectively.

References

External links

American film directors
American television directors
American television producers
Living people
Year of birth missing (living people)